Non-aligned Scouting and Scout-like organisations have been created over the years, separate and often distinct from the mainstream Scout Movement served by the World Association of Girl Guides and Girl Scouts (WAGGGS) and the World Organization of the Scout Movement (WOSM).

International Scouting organizations (excluding WAGGGS and WOSM)
Confédération Européenne de Scoutisme
International Scout and Guide Fellowship
Order of World Scouts
Skolta Esperanto Ligo
Union Internationale des Guides et Scouts d'Europe
World Federation of Independent Scouts
World Organization of Independent Scouts

Scouting organizations
Afghanistan Scout Association
American Heritage Girls
Associação dos Escuteiros de São Tomé e Príncipe
Association des Scouts de Djibouti
Association des Scouts et Guides de Riaumont
Baden-Powell Scouts' Association
Belarusian Scout Association
Canadian Traditional Scouting Association
Conférence Française de Scoutisme
Corpo Nacional de Escutas da Guiné-Bissau
Eclaireurs Neutres de France
Fédération du scoutisme centrafricain
Hashomer Hatzair
Homenetmen
Iran Scout Organization
Katholische Pfadfinderschaft Europas
Kyrgyz Respublikasynyn Skaut Kengesh
Kyrgyzstan Skaut-Kyzdar Assotsiatsiyasy
National Organization of Russian Scouts
National Scout Association of Eritrea
Organization of Russian Young Pathfinders
Pathfinder Scouts Association
Sahraoui Scout Association
Scout Club of Hainan
Scouts du Mali
União Dos Escoteiros Portugueses
Vietnamese Scout Association-Hội Huớng Đạo
Związek Harcerstwa Rzeczypospolitej
The Scouts/Guides Organisation in India

Inactive
American Boy Scouts
Bleimor (Scouting)
Sturmtrupp-Pfadfinder

Notable Scout-like organizations

Active
Awana US evangelical Scout-like organization
Boys' Brigade (The predecessor to the Scout Movement, created in the UK in 1883, 25 years before Baden-Powell's Scouts)
Camp Fire (nationwide US youth organisation)
Christian Service Brigade (non-denominational Christian youth organisation for boys in the USA and Canada)
Fianna Éireann (name used by various Irish republican youth organisations in the past)
Habonim Dror (Jewish youth organization, active in several countries)
Hanoar Hatzioni (Jewish youth organisation, active in several countries)
Hashomer Hatzair (Jewish youth organization, active in several countries)
Movimiento Exploradoril Salesiano (Argentina-Paraguay)
National Association of Russian Explorers (Russian émigré youth organisation in the USA)
National Catholic Committee for Trail Life USA (Trail Life USA in Roman Catholic parishes) 
Navigators USA (Formed in 2003 in USA, open to all children and communities now also in Uganda and United Kingdom) 
Pathfinders (Seventh-day Adventist youth organisation in several countries) * 
Pioneer movement (Communist youth organisation in several countries)
Royal Rangers (Pentecostal youth organisation in several countries = Exploradores del Rey) *
SpiralScouts International (neo-pagan youth organisation in the USA)
Trail Life USA (Evangelical Christian youth organization)
Wandervogel (old German youth movement that re-emerged after World War II after having been banned in 1935 by the Nazis)
The Woodcraft Folk (Modern version of British Kibbo Kift)

* considered Scouting in most European countries

Inactive
Kibbo Kift (British anti-war and anti-capitalistic youth organisation between 1920 and 1951)
TUXIS (Canadian Protestant youth organisation between the 1920s and the 1970s)
Hitler-Jugend (German Nazi youth organisation that existed from 1922 to 1945)
Vladimir Lenin All-Union Pioneer Organization (the largest youth organisation in the Soviet Union between 1922 and 1991)

See also
Traditional Scouting
List of World Organization of the Scout Movement members

Scouting-related lists